Panogena lingens is a moth of the family Sphingidae. It is known from Madagascar and the Comoro Islands.

It is similar, but much darker than Panogena jasmini. The abdomen has yellow lateral patches. The hindwing upperside is black at the extreme base.

The long-spurred Neobathiea grandidierana from Madagascar is pollinated by the long-tongued hawkmoth with the pollinaria deposited on the basal part of the proboscis of the moth.

Subspecies 
Panogena lingens lingens (Madagascar)
Panogena lingens comorana Griveaud, 1960 (Comoro Islands)

References 

Sphingini
Moths described in 1877
Moths of Madagascar
Orchid pollinators
Moths of Africa